Nardaran or Nardayan may refer to:
Nardaran, Baku, Azerbaijan
Nardaran, Gobustan, Azerbaijan
Nardaran, Siazan, Azerbaijan